Jake Bowey (born 12 September 2002) is an Australian rules footballer who plays for the Melbourne Football Club in the Australian Football League (AFL).

Early life
Bowey is the son of former St Kilda player Brett Bowey. 

Bowey participated in the Auskick program at the Highett Football Club. He went on to play junior and senior football with the club and under 18 football with the Sandringham in the NAB League.

He was educated at Cheltenham Secondary College.

Bowey was drafted by the Melbourne Football Club with pick 21, in the 2020 AFL draft.

AFL Career
Bowey made his AFL debut in the Demon's 98-point victory against  at Marvel Stadium in round 20, 2021. Bowey held his spot in the best 22 which propelled Melbourne to its first premiership since 1964. 

Statistics
Updated to the end of the 2022 AFL season.

|-
| scope=row bgcolor=F0E68C | 2021# ||  || 17
| 7 || 0 || 0 || 61 || 58 || 119 || 23 || 5 || 0.0 || 0.0 || 8.7 || 8.3 || 17.0 || 3.3 || 0.7
|-
| 2022 ||  || 17
| 17 || 2 || 0 || 173 || 111 || 284 || 69 || 29 || 0.1 || 0.0 || 10.2 || 6.5 || 16.7 || 4.1 || 1.7
|- class=sortbottom
! colspan=3 | Career
! 24 !! 2 !! 0 !! 234 !! 169 !! 403 !! 92 !! 34 !! 0.1 !! 0.0 !! 9.8 !! 7.0 !! 16.8 !! 3.8 !! 1.4
|}

Honours and achievements
Team
 AFL premiership player: 2021
 McClelland Trophy: 2021

Individual
 Harold Ball Memorial Trophy: 2017
 2× AFL Rising Star nominee: 2021, 2022

References

External links 

 
 

2002 births
Living people
Australian rules footballers from Victoria (Australia)
Melbourne Football Club players
Sandringham Dragons players
Melbourne Football Club Premiership players
One-time VFL/AFL Premiership players